Auguste Choquette (born 29 August 1932) was a Liberal party member of the House of Commons of Canada. He was a lawyer by career.

He was first elected at the Lotbinière riding in the 1963 general election after an unsuccessful attempt there in 1962. Choquette was re-elected in 1965, but with riding changes was defeated at Bellechasse riding in the 1968 federal election by Adrien Lambert of the Ralliement créditiste. Choquette did not seek another term in Parliament after this.

Choquette was a supporter of the Death Penalty.

References

External links
 

1932 births
Living people
Members of the House of Commons of Canada from Quebec
Liberal Party of Canada MPs
Lawyers in Quebec